Hayes & Yeading United Football Club, an association football club based in Hayes, Hillingdon, England, was founded in 2007 as a result of Hayes and Yeading merging as one team. In the 2006–07 Conference South the two teams finished in 19th and 16th respectively, so when they merged Hayes & Yeading United played in the same league the following season at level 6 in the English football league system. In their second season they were promoted to the Conference Premier after winning the 2009 Conference South play-offs. The club lasted three seasons in the Conference Premier before being relegated back into the Conference South. For the 2015–16 season the division was renamed National League South; in the same season Hayes & Yeading finished in 21st place and were relegated for the first time to level 7 in the English football league system to compete in the Southern Football League Premier Division.

Since their formation Hayes & Yeading United have also participated in two cup competitions each season, the FA Cup and the FA Trophy. Their furthest run in the FA Cup has seen the club reach the first round in four seasons: 2010–11, 2019–20, 2020–21 and 2021–22. Their furthest FA Trophy run has seen the club reach the second round the 2008–09 season where they were eliminated by AFC Telford United 4–0. As of the 2021–22 season, the club's first team has spent three seasons in the fifth tier of English football, six in the sixth tier, four in the seventh and two in the eighth. The table details their achievements in first-team competitions, and records their top goalscorer, for each season since their first appearance in the Conference South in 2007–08.

Key

Key to divisions
 Conference Premier – Conference Premier (level 5)
 Conference South – Conference South (level 6)
 National South – National League South (level 6)
 Southern Premier – Southern Football League Premier Division (level 7)
 Southern East – Southern Football League East Division (level 8)
 Isthmian South Central – Isthmian League South Central Division (level 8)

Key to rounds
 QR1 – First Qualifying Round
 QR2 – Second Qualifying Round
 QR3 – Third Qualifying Round
 QR4 – Fourth Qualifying Round
 R1 – First Round
 R2 – Second Round

Key to positions and symbols
  – Champions
  – Runners-up
  – Promoted
  – Relegated

Seasons

Notes

References

External links
 

Seasons
English football club seasons